Garneddwen (also known as Garnedd-Wen) is a hamlet in the south of the county of Gwynedd, Wales. It lies in the historic county of Merionethshire/Sir Feirionnydd, in the valley of the Afon Dulas.

It consists primarily of a single row of terraced houses, built for the workers at Aberllefenni Slate Quarry. The hamlet was named after a large cairn ("carnedd" in Welsh) that was to be found in a field below the farm of the same name up to Victorian times.

History 
Sarn Helen, a Roman road which connected the north and south parts of Roman Wales, probably ran through the hamlet.

Nearby is Fronwen, built as a family home by the quarry manager Robert Hughes (1813–1882) and his wife Jane née Deakin (1822–1906). They had four sons who were born in this house :
 Llewelyn Robert (born 1856)
 Arthur Edward (1857–1918), who married future author Molly Thomas in 1897
 Charles Ernest (born 1859)
 Alfred William (1861–1900) Professor of Anatomy and Dean of the Faculty of King's College London, whose monument stands on the outskirts of Corris

Railway Station 
The station was open from 25 August 1887, until the end of passenger services, in December 1930. The former railway's trackbed at Garneddwen is now an access road for the hamlet.

Geology 
The hamlet gives its name to the Garnedd-Wen Formation, a thick rock strata that runs from Tywyn to Dinas Mawddwy and was first identified close by the settlement.

References

External links

Villages in Gwynedd
Corris